William B. Tabler Sr. (October 28, 1914 – February 3, 2004) was an American architect who designed more than 400 hotels. He was best known for giving Hilton hotels the clean but sometimes stark face of corporate America, most notably in the 46-story slablike New York Hilton Midtown near Rockefeller Center.

Biography
Tabler was born in Momence, Illinois, and received his bachelor's and master's degrees from Harvard. In 1939 he joined the Chicago firm Holabird & Root, where he worked on his first big hotel project, the 1,000-room Statler Hotel in Washington, D.C.

After serving in the United States Navy during the World War II, he became head of Statler's in-house architecture department in 1946. He formed his own practice, William B Tabler Architects, in 1955.

Tabler's designs affected generations of travelers after World War II when downtown hotels began to look more and more like the office buildings around them.

Tabler designed the 2,153-room Hilton New York near Rockefeller Center in 1963 with David P. Dann for a partnership called Rock-Hil-Uris for its principals: Laurance S. Rockefeller, Conrad Hilton, and Percy Uris and Harold Uris.

Tabler died at his home in Upper Brookville, New York at the age of 89.  His son, William B. Tabler Jr., is also an architect and continues the architectural practice in Manhattan.

Buildings

 The Statler Hilton Dallas (1956)
 Pittsburgh Hilton (1959)
 El Ponce Intercontinental (1960-1975)
 New York Hilton (1963)
 London Hilton (1963)
 San Francisco Hilton  (1964)
 Washington Hilton (1965)
 Inter-Continental Dacca (1966)
 Grand Hyatt Cairo (2000)

References

External links
 

1914 births
2004 deaths
Harvard University alumni
20th-century American architects
Architects from Illinois
People from Momence, Illinois
People from Upper Brookville, New York